The Battles of Parczew, Jabłoń and Milanów constituted one of the major battles between the Polish Army and the Red Army during the Soviet invasion of Poland. They took place on September 29–30 of 1939 at the beginning of the Second World War. They resulted in a Polish victory, as the Polish units successfully broke through the Soviet forces near the town of Parczew and progressed towards the Świętokrzyskie Mountains.

Background
Germany invaded Poland on 1 September 1939, marking the beginning of World War II. On 17 September 1939 the Soviet Union, then an ally of Germany, invaded Poland from the east. They encountered only limited resistance, as the majority of Polish forces were thinly stretched against the German invaders. Despite the increasingly difficult situation, some Polish units continued to struggle against the advancing enemies; one of the units resisting the Soviets was the Independent Operational Group Polesie under General Franciszek Kleeberg.

Battles
The Polesie Group, about 18,000 strong, was followed by the Soviets, which planned to neutralize it before securing the Polesie region.

The group encountered the Soviets on September 28 near the village of Jabłoń, while advancing south towards Parczew. A number of smaller engagements took place over the next two days. The Soviet advance was interrupted by a successful Polish defense, and eventually a Polish counterattack pushed the Soviets back. As the Polish units advanced towards Milanów, they defeated another Soviet attack, inflicting significant casualties on the enemy and taking a number of prisoners.

Aftermath
Soviets took over 100 casualties near Milanów. Their casualties at Jabłoń were few dozen, with a tank captured and another few dozen POWs switching sides to join the Polish army.

After the Soviet forces were defeated, they did not engage the Polesie Group again; instead they would pass the initiative in the region to the German forces, which would engage the Poles instead in what would become the last major battle of the Polish campaign.

See also 

 List of World War II military equipment of Poland
 List of Soviet Union military equipment of World War II

Notes

References

Parczew
Battles of the Soviet invasion of Poland
Lublin Voivodeship (1919–1939)
September 1939 events